A Bahraini Tale is a 2006 Bahraini Arabic-language drama film directed by Bassam Al-Thawadi, screenplay by Fareed Ramadan and starring Saad Abdulla, Fatima Abdulrahim and Abdulla Al Sa'adawi.  This is the third feature film to be directed by Bassam al-Thawadi and one of the only three films ever made in Bahrain.

Synopsis
Set during the Six-Day War of 1967, the film revolves around the personal story of a middle-class Bahraini family and an account of the hopes and faith the Arab world had in Gamal Abdul Nasser as its leader.

Cast
 Saad Abdulla as Salim 
 Fatima Abdulrahim as Fatima 
 Abdulla Al Sa'adawi as Juma Khamis 
 Ebrahim Al-Ghanim as Tickets Man 
 Hassan Al-Majed as Mahmood 
 Mahmood Al-Mulla as Bu Jassim 
 Juma'an Al-Rowayai as Hamad 
 Ahmed Aqlan as Sultan 
 Abdulla Bahar as Mad Man 
 Yousif Bu Hallol as Yaqoob 
 Ahmed Fardan as Salman 
 Shayma Janahi as Munira 
 Mubarak Khamis as Abdulla Khamis 
 Abdulrahman Mahmood as Man 
 Wafa Maki as Mahmood Sister 
 Abdulla Malik as Ali 
 Fahad Mandi as Yahya 
 Latifa Mujren as Hamad's Mother 
 Shatha Sabt as Nayla 
 Majeda Sultan as Sharoof Al-Zarqa 
 Abdulla Wlaad as Rashed 
 Mariam Ziman as Latifa 
 Nadeem Ziman as Khalifa

Reception 
The film was screened nationwide across Bahrain and across the Arab world. The film was critically acclaimed by critics locally and internationally. It was given a 90% rating by Rotten Tomatoes - NB: not available on Rotten Tomatoes so not verifiable.

References

External links 
 
 A Bahraini Tale at Rotten Tomatoes
 Review by local critic

2006 drama films
2006 films
Bahraini drama films
2000s Arabic-language films
Films set in 1967
Films set in 1970
Films set in Bahrain
Films shot in Bahrain
Works about the Six-Day War
Coming-of-age films based on actual events
2000s coming-of-age drama films